The Dorsey Road Warehouse is a U.S. National Security Agency warehouse located at 1472 Dorsey Road in Hanover, Maryland. Built between 1995 and 1996 at a cost of $10 million, the warehouse is a storage facility for sophisticated signals intelligence and communications security equipment, including spy satellites, as well as office equipment and supplies.

References

National Security Agency facilities
Buildings and structures in Anne Arundel County, Maryland